Pantheon is a steel roller coaster at Busch Gardens Williamsburg theme park in Williamsburg, Virginia. Manufactured by Intamin, the roller coaster opened to park members on March 4, 2022 and features four launches, five airtime hills, and a 95-degree beyond vertical drop. Its theme is set to ancient Rome with a focus on the ancient culture's deities Jupiter, Mercury, Minerva, Neptune and Pluto. It is also being marketed as the fastest multi-launch roller coaster in the world, breaking a record previously held by Taron at Phantasialand.

History 
This ride was referred to as Project MMXX during the early construction stages and replaced an earlier project named Project Madrid, where Busch Gardens filed a 315 feet height waiver for a cancelled attraction.

The initial planning application for the ride was filed in February 2019, and it was eventually announced to be Pantheon on July 30, 2019. The announcement was held in the globe theater at the park and streamed live on the park's Facebook page. Leading up to the announcements there was a series of teasers posted on social media. By October 2019, photos indicated that construction of the track had begun. Pantheon's opening was ultimately delayed by two years due to the COVID-19 pandemic in Virginia. Busch Gardens announced in September 2021 that the ride would open the following March. The ride opened to the public on March 25, 2022, following a soft opening on March 4.

Characteristics

Statistics
This made it the second fastest roller coaster in Virginia upon opening, behind Intimidator 305 at Kings Dominion. The ride's layout includes four launches – three of which occur on a swing launch between the vertical spike and top hat. This swing launch can also be found on Toutatis at Parc Astérix in France. Pantheon also has two inversions, which are a zero-g winder and a zero-g stall. It runs two trains of five cars, each of which seat two rows of two riders for a total of 20 passengers per train.

References

External links 
 

Busch Gardens Williamsburg
Roller coasters operated by SeaWorld Parks & Entertainment
Roller coasters in Virginia